J. Malsawma, is a Mizo writer and scholar from North East Indian state of Mizoram, India. The Government of India honoured him, in 2013, by awarding him the Padma Shri, the fourth highest civilian award, for his contributions to the fields of literature.

Publications
J. Malsawma hails is a known writer in mizo language and is credited with several books on mizo culture and poetry. 
 His book, Vanglai is a mixed content publication with essays on mizo religion and culture and biographies of a selected number of mizo personalities.

Awards
 Malsawma is a recipient of the Academy Award from the Mizo Academy of Letters, which he received in 2001. 
 In 2013, he was honoured by the Government of India with the civilian award of Padma Shri.
 He has also received the Certificate of Appreciation from the Mizo Writers Association three times  

Malsawma is a member of the Mizo Publication Board and the State Advisory Board on Tribal Art, Culture, Language, and the Indian national Trust for Arts and Cultural Heritage. he was the founder secretary of the Mizo Academy of Letters during 1964-65 and was its advisor later.

See also
 Mizo language

References

External links
 

Living people
Recipients of the Padma Shri in literature & education
People from Aizawl
Mizo people
Writers from Mizoram
Indian social sciences writers
Indian male writers
English-language writers from India
20th-century Indian non-fiction writers
Year of birth missing (living people)